The Smoky Mountains are part of the Rocky Mountains and located on the west side of the Wood River Valley near Sun Valley, Idaho, in the Western United States. The range is within Sawtooth National Forest, while part of it is within the Sawtooth National Recreation Area.

The Smoky Mountains area closely surrounded by other mountain ranges including the Sawtooth Mountains to the northwest, Boulder Mountains to the north, Pioneer Mountains to the east, and Soldier Mountains to the south. The Smoky Mountains are located within the watersheds of the Big Wood, Salmon, and Boise Rivers. The mountains are most easily accessed from Idaho State Highway 75, although many unimproved and improved dirt roads, including National Forest road 227, enter and cross the mountains.

The Smoky Mountains were named from the frequent forest fires in the mountains. In 2007 the Castle Rock Fire burned  of the Smoky Mountains near Ketchum.

Peaks

Lakes

Gallery

See also

 Sawtooth National Recreation Area
 Sawtooth National Forest

References 

Ranges of the Rocky Mountains
Mountain ranges of Idaho
Landforms of Blaine County, Idaho
Landforms of Camas County, Idaho
Sawtooth National Forest